The 2016–17 season was Crystal Palace's fourth consecutive season in the Premier League and their 111th year in existence. This season, Crystal Palace participated in the Premier League, FA Cup and League Cup. The season covers the period from 1 July 2016 to 30 June 2017.

Competitions

Overview

Goalscorers

Disciplinary record

References

Crystal Palace
Crystal Palace F.C. seasons